The Dead Cities or Forgotten Cities are a group of 700 abandoned settlements in northwest Syria between Aleppo and Idlib. Around 40 villages grouped in eight archaeological parks situated in north-western Syria provide an insight into rural life in Late Antiquity and during the Byzantine period. Most of the villages, which date from the 1st to 7th centuries, were  abandoned between the 8th and 10th centuries. The settlements feature the well-preserved architectural remains of dwellings, pagan temples, churches, cisterns, bathhouses etc. Important dead cities include the Church of Saint Simeon Stylites, Serjilla and al Bara.

The Dead Cities are situated in an elevated area of limestone known as Limestone Massif. The Massif includes three groups of highlands: the first is the northern group of Mount Simeon and Mount Kurd; the second middle group is the group of Harim Mountains; the third southern group is the group of Zawiya Mountain.

History

Chris Wickham, in the authoritative survey of the post-Roman world, "Framing the Early Middle Ages" (2006) argues that these were settlements of prosperous peasants which have few or no specifically urban features. The impressive remains of domestic architecture are the result of the prosperity of peasants who benefited from a strong international trade in olive oil at the end of Antiquity.

Another argument is that these were prosperous cities that flourished because they were located along major trade routes in the Byzantine Empire, and not merely prosperous peasant settlements.  After conquest by the Arabs, the trade routes changed, and as a result these towns lost the majority of the business which fostered their economies. On this view, settlers eventually abandoned their towns and headed for other cities that were flourishing under the Arabs and the Umayyads as increasing urbanisation took its toll.

The ancient villages of the Dead Cities illustrate the transition from the ancient pagan world of the Roman Empire to Byzantine Christianity.

The Dead Cites were inscribed as a UNESCO World Heritage Site in 2011, under the name of "Ancient Villages of Northern Syria".

Before the Syrian Civil War most sites had become easily accessible, the majority of the dead cities were well-preserved and tourists could access the sites quite freely, though some of the Dead Cities are quite difficult to reach without a guide (there is a guidebook by Abdallah Hadjar with a detailed map that is useful for finding the lesser known sites; The Church of St Simeon Stylites and Other Archaeological Sites in the Mountains of Simeon and Halaqa.

Archeological sites
Dead cities and archeological sites in Limestone Massif include Church of Saint Simeon Stylites, Serjilla, Bara, Basufan, Barisha, Qalb Loze, Barad, Cyrrhus, Turmanin, Banabil, Kafr Aruq, Kafr Dariyan, Babuline, Hazarin, Jarada, Maghara, Shinan, Farkya, Ein Laruz, Ebla, Deir Sunbul, Al-Dana, Sarmada and Al-Dana.

Mount Simeon, Mount Kurd and Mount Ḥalqa

Harim Mountains (Mount Bārīshā and Mount Aʻlā)

Mount Zāwiya

See also
 World Heritage Sites in Danger

References

External links

 Simeon Citadel and Dead Cities, Suggestion to have the Dead Cities recognized as a UNESCO world heritage site, in 2006, as part of "Simeon Citadel and Dead Cities"-project.
 Pictures of four dead cities

 
Former populated places in Syria
World Heritage Sites in Danger
Persecution of Christians by Muslims
Churches destroyed by Muslims